Kani-Kombole (Kà:n-kómbòlò) is a Dogon village in the Cercle of Bankass in the Mopti Region of south-eastern Mali. It is part of the Kani village cluster.

The village has a mosque.

References

Communes of Mopti Region